Bythinella vesontiana is a species of very small freshwater snail, an aquatic gastropod mollusk in the family Amnicolidae. This species is endemic to France.

References

Bythinella
Gastropods described in 1989
Taxonomy articles created by Polbot